PEAC-Pécs is the first-class women basketball team of Pécs, Hungary. The team started in the Hungarian Championship division A in 2012/2013 season. Beside the Hungarian Championship the team also attending the Hungarian Cup and the MŽRKL also known as the Women's Adriatic League.

The Team

References

Women's basketball teams in Hungary
Basketball teams established in 1923